Sandu may refer to:

People

Surname
Adrian Sandu (born 1966), Romanian gymnast
Bianca Sandu (born 1992), Romanian footballer
Constantin Sandu (born 1993), Moldovan footballer
Corina Sandu, Romanian-American mechanical engineer
Cristina Sandu (born 1990), Romanian long jumper and triple jumper
Florin Sandu (born 1987), Romanian footballer
Florin Sandu (lawyer) (born 1949), Romanian lawyer and academic and former chief of the Romanian Police
Florinel Sandu (born 2001), Romanian footballer
Gabriel Sandu (born 1963), Romanian economist and politician
Gabriel Sandu (footballer) (1952–1998), Romanian football defender
Iddris Sandu (born 1997), Ghanaian-American software engineer
Ion Sandu (born 1993), Moldovan footballer
Maia Sandu (born 1972), Moldovan politician and president of the country
Marian Sandu (born 1972), Romanian Greco-Roman wrestler
Mihaela Sandu (born 1977), Romanian chess player
Mihai Gruia Sandu (born 1956), Romanian actor, playwright, and director
Mircea Sandu (born 1952), Romanian footballer
Raluca Sandu (born 1980), Romanian tennis and padel player
Roco Sandu (born 1966), Romanian footballer

Given name
Sandu Boc, or Alexandru Boc (born 1946), Romanian footballer
Sandu Ciorba, Romanian Roma singer
Sandu Ciorăscu (born 1966), Romanian rugby union football player
Sandu Florea (born 1946), Romanian-American comic book and comic strip creator
Sandu Iovu (born 1996), Romanian footballer
Sandu Mitrofan (born 1952), Romanian bobsledder
Sandu Negrean (born 1974), Romanian footballer
Sandu Popescu (born 1956), Romanian-British physicist
Sandu Tudor (1896–1962), Romanian poet, journalist, theologian, and Orthodox monk
Sandu Tăbârcă (born 1965), Romanian football player and manager

Places

China
Sandu Shui Autonomous County (三都水族自治县), Guizhou

Towns (三都镇)
Sandu, Fujian, in Jiaocheng District, Ningde
Sandu, Guangxi, in Liujiang County

Sandu, Hainan, in Danzhou
Sandu, Leiyang, in Leiyang, Hunan
Sandu, Zixing, in Zixing, Hunan
Sandu, Jiangxi, in Tonggu County
Sandu, Jiande, in Jiande, Zhejiang

Townships (三都乡)
Sandu Township, Shanxi, a township-level division of Shanxi
Sandu Township, Zhejiang, in Songyang County

Gambia
Sandu District

Other uses
South African National Defence Union, a trade union
"Sandu", a jazz standard by Clifford Brown

See also
SANDU v Minister of Defence (disambiguation)

Romanian-language surnames